The Liberty Korea Party held a leadership election on 27 February 2019 to elect the next leader of the Liberty Korea Party for a new 2-year term. It was an election to succeed an interim leader Kim Byong-joon, who has been in office for about seven months since the defeat of the Liberty Korea Party in the local elections held on 13 June 2018.

Candidates

Running 
 Hwang Kyo-ahn, former acting President of South Korea, former Prime Minister of South Korea, former Minister of Justice.
 Oh Se-hoon, former Mayor of Seoul, former member of the National Assembly.
 Kim Jin-tae, member of the National Assembly.

Results 
The ratio of the results by sector was 70% for delegates, 30% for opinion poll.

References 

Liberty Korea Party
Political party leadership elections in South Korea
February 2019 events in South Korea
2019 in South Korea
Liberty Korea Party leadership election